Citrix Systems, Inc. is an American multinational cloud computing and virtualization technology company that provides server, application and desktop virtualization, networking, software as a service (SaaS), and cloud computing technologies. Citrix products were claimed to be in use by over 400,000 clients worldwide, including 99% of the Fortune 100, and 98% of the Fortune 500.
 
The company was founded in Richardson, Texas, in 1989 by Ed Iacobucci, who served as chairman until his departure in 2000. It began by developing remote access products for Microsoft operating systems, licensing source code from Microsoft, and has been in partnership with the company throughout its history. By the 1990s, Citrix came to prominence as an industry leader in thin client technology, enabling purpose-built devices to access remote servers and resources. The company launched its first initial public offering in 1995 and, with few competitors, experienced large revenue increases between 1995 and 1999.
 
Citrix acquired Sequoia Software Corp. in 2001 and ExpertCity, a provider of remote desktop products, in 2003. This was followed by more than a dozen other acquisitions from 2005 to 2012, which allowed Citrix to expand into server and desktop virtualization, cloud computing, infrastructure as a service, and software as a service offerings. In 2014, Citrix acquired Framehawk and used its technology to improve the delivery of virtual desktops and applications over wireless networks. In 2016, as part of a US$1.8 billion product deal with LogMeIn, Citrix spun off the GoTo product line into a new business entity, entitled GetGo. In 2017, Citrix completed the merger of GetGo with LogMeIn's products.

Citrix had its corporate headquarters in Fort Lauderdale, Florida, with subsidiary operations in California and Massachusetts, and additional development centers in Canada, Denmark, Germany, India, and the United Kingdom. In 2021, Citrix generated $3.2 billion in revenue and had 9,700 employees.

Following the completion of acquisition by Vista Equity Partners and Evergreen Coast Capital Corp on September 30, 2022, Citrix merged with TIBCO Software under the newly formed Cloud Software Group. Citrix spun off the re-branded Citrix ADC back into a standalone entity Netscaler under the same parent.

History

Early history

Citrix was founded in Richardson, Texas, in 1989 by former IBM developer Ed Iacobucci with $3 million in funding. Following its initial setup and development, Iacobucci moved the company to his former home of Coral Springs, Florida. The company's first employees were five other engineers from IBM that Iacobucci convinced to join his team. Iacobucci served as chairman of the company and Roger Roberts became the CEO of Citrix in 1990. Citrix was originally named Citrus, but changed its name after an existing company claimed trademark rights. The Citrix name is a portmanteau of Citrus and UNIX.

The company's first product was Citrix Multiuser, an extension of OS/2 developed over two years. Citrix licensed the OS/2 source code from Microsoft, and developed its own Independent Computing Architecture (ICA) protocol for Citrix Multiuser. Multiuser allowed multiple users working on separate computers remote access to software on a server, even from computers not built to run OS/2. Three days before the product launched in 1991, Microsoft announced they would be switching from OS/2 to Windows. The switch made Multiuser nearly unusable without significant changes to make it compatible with Windows or DOS. The company discussed closing in 1991, but investments from Intel, Microsoft and Kleiner Perkins Caufield & Byers among others, allowed the company to work on a new version of Multiuser.

Multi-Win version 2.0 was released in 1992. It was compatible with DOS applications and allowed up to five users. In 1993, Citrix released a new remote applications server, WinView, which had the ability to run DOS and Windows applications. By 1994, the company's yearly revenue equaled $10 million.

The company launched WinFrame, a multi-user operating system based on Microsoft's Windows NT, in 1995. The new product allowed up to 15 users and was the first thin client for Windows.

Rise in popularity
Citrix had its initial public offering in December 1995. The company's share price doubled from $15 to $30. During the mid-1990s, Citrix became the leader of its growing industry with very few competitors, and the company's revenues doubled year over year between 1995 and 1999.

Following weeks of discussions, Iacobucci was able to persuade Microsoft to agree to license Citrix technology for Windows NT Server 4.0, which resulted in Windows Terminal Server Edition in 1998. This agreement allowed Citrix to keep its position in the marketplace and be NT 4.0 compatible. Citrix also earned $75 million through the agreement, along with a royalty arrangement that was valued at approximately $100 million.

Citrix released MetaFrame 1.0 in conjunction with Terminal Server Edition. Due to weaknesses in Microsoft's Remote Desktop Protocol (RDP), Terminal Server Edition worked best using the ICA protocol developed by Citrix and found in MetaFrame. This meant that Citrix technology was purchased and installed on most machines running Terminal Server Edition.

In 1997, the company opened a new headquarters in Fort Lauderdale, Florida. It also opened offices in Sydney, London and Paris that same year.

In 1998, Mark Templeton became the CEO of Citrix after serving as vice president of marketing. Also in 1998, it licensed its ICA protocol to IBM and Key Tronics. Citrix licensed its ICA protocol to Motorola for use in digital wireless handsets in 1999.

During 1999, the thin-client model Citrix used, became a software trend and the company's customers increased to 15 million. Major clients included Sears, AT&T, and Chevron. A sudden drop in stocks in 2000 led to Iacobucci leaving the company and CEO Mark Templeton being demoted to president and senior executive officer. Templeton was later reinstated in 2001.

Expansion

In 2001 Citrix acquired the Sequoia Software Corp. for $185 million. That same year it released MetaFrame XP, a new platform using MetaFrame technology. This was later rebranded by Citrix as Presentation Server, in 2005.

On July 9, 2002, Citrix announced a 10% job cut. At the time the company employed about 1,900 workers. After the announcement the stock hit a five-year low.

Citrix acquired ExpertCity, a provider of remote desktop products, in December 2003 for $225 million in cash and stock. The acquisition was the largest for the company up to that date. Through the acquisition, Citrix gained ExpertCity's existing products GoToMyPC and GoToAssist, and ExpertCity became the Citrix Online division of the company. In 2004, the company introduced Citrix GoToMeeting.

Between 2005 and 2012, the company acquired over a dozen companies that allowed them to expand in new markets. Citrix acquired acceleration hardware maker NetScaler in 2005, which allowed the company to offer optimized application delivery. The company entered the server and desktop virtualization market with the purchase of XenSource in August 2007.
Citrix expanded cloud and Infrastructure as a Service (IaaS) offerings in August 2010 with the acquisition of VMLogix. In February 2011, Citrix entered the European Software as a Service (SaaS) market with the acquisition of Netviewer.

In 2007, the company opened a headquarters in Silicon Valley. In 2008, the company changed the name of its Presentation Server product line to XenApp. Also in 2008, Citrix announced an expanded alliance with Microsoft on desktop virtualization. On January 29, 2009, Citrix announced that 460 employee positions would be cut, comprising 10% of its workforce. In August 2010, Citrix announced a partnership with Google to bring the company's products to ChromeOS devices. On July 14, 2015, Citrix added full support for Windows 10 to its desktop virtualization products.

The company became a leader in IaaS after the acquisition of Cloud.com, provider of cloud infrastructure for companies, in July 2011. Citrix began offering VDI-in-a-box to small and medium businesses with the acquisition of Kaviza in May 2011. The company acquired technology for cloud-based file sharing and storage through its purchase of ShareFile in October 2011.

In May 2012, Citrix acquired Virtual Computer, maker of intelligent desktop virtualization. The technology is used in the company's XenClient Enterprise edition. Citrix entered the mobile video and telecom markets in June 2012 when the company acquired ByteMobile. Also in 2012, the company acquired Zenprise. Zenprise's Mobile application management (MAM) technology was released as XenMobile in February 2013.

Citrix acquired Framehawk in January 2014 in order to use the company's technology to improve the delivery of virtual desktops and applications over wireless networks, including cellular, where speed and quality may be poor. In May 2014, Citrix acquired Scalextreme to bolster its cloud capabilities for its core business unit of XenDesktop and Xenapp such as auto scaling, patching and automation of complex deployments from the cloud.

On January 29, 2015, Citrix announced that 700 full-time and 200 contractor positions would be eliminated. This constituted about 10% of its workforce. The cuts were expected to save between $90 and $100 million a year. Two hundred of the layoffs occurred in Fort Lauderdale, Florida, where the company is headquartered.

The company had 10,081 employees as of February 2015. In December 2015, Citrix employed approximately 9,500 people, but noted that its November restructure was due to eliminate nearly 700 full-time jobs. As of December 31, 2021, Citrix had approximately 9,700 employees.

Recent history
Citrix reported net income of $251.7 million in 2014, down from $339.5 million in 2013. In July 2015, the company announced several changes to its board of directors, including Robert Calderoni's becoming executive chairman and adding Jesse Cohn as a senior partner of activist hedge fund Elliott Management. That same month the company announced that president and CEO Mark Templeton would retire after a replacement was found, and on October 21, the company named its executive chairman, Robert Calderoni, as interim president and CEO.

In January 2016, Kirill Tatarinov, a former Microsoft executive, was named the president and CEO of Citrix and joined the company's board. Calderoni remained executive chairman of the board.

In July 2016, as part of a deal with Boston-based SaaS company LogMeIn, Citrix announced it had spun off its GoTo product line, which included GoToMeeting, GoToWebinar, GoToWebcast, GoToTraining, GoToAssist and GoToMyPC, into a wholly owned subsidiary called GetGo. In February 2017, Citrix completed a merger through which GetGo became a subsidiary of LogMeIn. The transaction was valued at approximately $1.8 billion. David Henshall became the company's CEO in July 2017.

Also in 2017, Citrix expanded its partnership with Google. In May, Google announced it would add support to run Citrix XenApp on its Chrome web browser, including graphics processing unit acceleration. In July, the companies announced they were working to allow Citrix Cloud to deploy virtualized apps and desktops on Google Cloud.

In October 2017, Citrix told regulators of plans to lay off staff "across most functions" and consolidate offices in the fall 2017 into 2018. The company carried out layoffs in Raleigh, North Carolina, and office closures in Santa Barbara, California, and Tempe, Arizona.

Citrix unveiled its Citrix Analytics security software at the 2017 Citrix Synergy conference in Orlando, Florida, in May 2017. The software detects and responds to security threats by relying on artificial intelligence.

Citrix unveiled its Citrix Analytics for Performance at the 2019 Citrix Summit conference in Orlando, Florida, in May 2019. The software quantifies User experience for Virtual applications and desktop users and leverages machine learning to troubleshoot performance issues

In 2018, Citrix changed the names of some of its products to represent its shift to a cloud operating model. The company stated that it made the name changes to present a unified product line so that end users can create, manage, and deploy workspaces with apps and data from a single console. The company dropped its Xen and NetScaler brand names: XenApp and XenDesktop became Citrix Virtual Apps and Desktops; XenMobile became Citrix Endpoint Management; ShareFile integration became Citrix Content Collaboration; XenServer became Citrix Hypervisor; Cedexis became Citrix Intelligent Traffic Management; and NetScaler products kept their identities, yet the "NetScaler" brand name was replaced with "Citrix ADC" for Application Delivery Controller.

Henshall stepped down in October 2021, and Calderoni was again named interim CEO.

In July 2022, Citrix announced that Tom Krause would succeed Robert Calderoni as CEO of the company following its merger with TIBCO software. In September 2022, Citrix announced a $4.55 billion-equivalent cross-border term loan to back Vista Equity and Evergreen Coast Capital's $16.5 billion buyout of Citrix and merger with Vista portfolio company TIBCO Software to form Cloud Software Group (CSG). Following the merge, Citrix Hypervisor product split from Citrix making it a standalone business under CSG and rechristened as XenServer.

Operations
Citrix is governed by a ten-member board of directors. Citrix has headquarters in Fort Lauderdale, Florida. Its other United States offices are in California and North Carolina. Citrix research and development centers are located in the U.S., Australia, India, Japan, Greece and the United Kingdom.

Citrix licenses its services and products directly to clients, including IT professionals, SMEs, and through companies called value-added resellers that resell the products and services after adding additional features.

Citrix is publicly traded under the ticker symbol CTXS. In 2020, the company ranked 779 on the Fortune 1000 and 1,267 on Forbes Global 2000. In 2019, Citrix generated $3.01 billion in revenue.

On January 31, 2022, it was announced that Citrix had been acquired in a $16.5 billion deal by affiliates of Vista Equity Partners and Evergreen Coast Capital. The all-cash acquisition will see Citrix merge with TIBCO, a Vista portfolio company. It has already been reported that Citrix will go private through this deal.

Acquisitions

Citrix has expanded and added new products, technologies, and services through a number of acquisitions. Its first acquisition was DataPac in 1997, which Citrix purchased in order to utilize DataPac's technology and its position in the Asia-Pacific region. Other major acquisitions include ExpertCity in 2004, NetScaler in 2005, XenSource in 2007 and ShareFile in 2011. As of 2015, Citrix has acquired nearly 50 companies.

In November 2018, Citrix paid $200 million to acquire Sapho, a software startup that develops micro apps for workers. In January 2021, Citrix announced its intention to acquire Wrike for $2.25 billion. The acquisition was completed in March 2021.

Products
Citrix creates software that allows the individuals of an enterprise to work and collaborate remotely regardless of device or network. The main areas the company works in are desktop and apps; Desktop as a Service (DaaS); networking and cloud; and Software as a service (SaaS).

Desktops and apps
Citrix offers a number of products related to desktop and application virtualization. These tools allow access to Windows desktops and applications independently of the machine they are actually on, and from any device with any operating system. Citrix XenApp provides application virtualization (now integrated as part of XenDesktop), and Citrix XenDesktop, Citrix VDI-in-a-Box and XenClient all provide desktop virtualization. The DesktopPlayer for Mac allows online and offline access to Windows virtual desktops from Macs. Citrix Workspace Cloud is a platform for building and delivering desktops and applications from the cloud. ShareFile allows companies and organizations to sync and share files. XenMobile offers mobile app and device management, Citrix Receiver is a client software that allows universal access to virtual applications and desktops, and AppDNA, software that provides application migration and management.
Citrix users interact with the HDX protocol on top of the RDS. So, this protocol acts as a buffer between the users and the server, compressing the data in the meantime as well.

Desktop as a service (DaaS)
Citrix technology enables service providers to provide Desktop as a Service (DaaS) offerings to their customers, including business apps and desktops. These products include: Worx Mobile Apps for secure email, browser, and document sharing; and Citrix Workspace Suite for mobile workspaces.

Networking and cloud
Citrix products related to cloud computing and networking include Citrix XenServer for server virtualization and its NetScaler brand of network appliances, including WAN optimization devices, Software-Defined WAN delivery equipment, Application Delivery Controllers (ADC), Gateways, and AppFirewall web application firewall. All this are managed by their cloud management software Citrix Cloud. The company also has ByteMobile Adaptive Traffic Management, which aims to optimize mobile video services through traffic management, policy control and caching, and ByteMobile Insight, which provides mobile data and subscriber analytics.

Software as a service (SaaS)
Citrix software as a service (SaaS) products are focused on collaboration and communications. The offerings include Podio, a cloud-based collaboration service, and OpenVoice, which provides audio conferencing.

Corporate responsibility
The company's philanthropic activities include corporate giving—such as corporate donations of in-kind gifts—and employee match programs. In addition, Citrix employees are allowed to take two paid volunteer days each year and participate in the company's annual "Global Day of Impact"—an event that encourages Citrix employees to volunteer in their local communities.

Near its Fort Lauderdale headquarters, Citrix has provided business training to non-profit teams. In particular, the company helped a local non-profit organization launch a computer on wheels to offer training to low-income neighborhoods. In 2007, the company connected a Broward County, Florida, neighborhood with Agogo, Ghana, through donated technology and training. Furthermore, the company's Raleigh office began a program called "Project Code" in 2014, which leads youth from local Boys & Girls Clubs through coding exercises and teaches them about computer science.

In addition to its philanthropic activities, Citrix has donated some of its open-source technology to non-profit software organizations to continue its development and gain more contributors. Citrix gave Cloudstack to the Apache Foundation in 2012 and Xen hypervisor to the Linux Foundation in 2013.

See also 
 Citrix Workspace, their SW, the solution to virtual access

References

Further reading 
 Keith Schultz (December 14, 2011) VDI shoot-out: Citrix XenDesktop vs. VMware View. Citrix XenDesktop 5.5 and VMware View 5 vie for the most flexible, scalable, and complete virtual desktop infrastructure, InfoWorld
 Keith Schultz (December 14, 2011) VDI shoot-out: HDX vs. PCoIP. The differences between the Citrix and VMware remote desktop protocols are more than skin deep, InfoWorld
 Colt Agar (January 19, 2018) Grasshopper Phone Review - Virtual Phone System for Entrepreneurs, TheTechReviewer.com

External links 

 
Software companies based in Florida
Software companies based in the San Francisco Bay Area
Cloud computing providers
Remote desktop
Companies based in Fort Lauderdale, Florida
Software companies established in 1989
American companies established in 1989
1989 establishments in Texas
Companies formerly listed on the Nasdaq
1995 initial public offerings
Software companies of the United States
Technology companies based in Florida
2022 mergers and acquisitions